Pannes is a commune in the Meurthe-et-Moselle department in north-eastern France.

Geography
The village lies in the middle of the commune, on the left bank of the Madine, a stream, tributary of the  Rupt de Mad, which forms part of the commune's south-eastern border.

See also
Communes of the Meurthe-et-Moselle department
Parc naturel régional de Lorraine

References

Communes of Meurthe-et-Moselle